Joseph Thieman is a retired American soccer midfielder who played three games for D.C. United in 1997.

Youth
Thieman attended Bishop Denis J. O'Connell High School where he was a three year varsity soccer player.  His senior season, he was the 1989-1990 Gatorade Virginia High School Player of the Year.  He was inducted into the school’s hall of Fame in 2006.  He then attended Princeton University, playing on the men’s soccer team from 1990 to 1994.  His freshman season, he was the Ivy League Rookie of the Year.  He finished his career with 14 goals and 25 assists  He was also a 1992 first team and a 1993 second team All American.  He graduated in 1994 with a bachelor's degree in history.

Professional
After graduation, Thieman moved to Belgium to pursue a professional career with Charleroi. On February 2, 1997, D.C. United selected Thieman in the third round (thirtieth overall) in the 1997 MLS Supplemental Draft. He played three games for United before being waived on June 27, 1997.  In 2001, he played for the San Francisco Scots in the San Francisco Football League Premier Division.

In 2000, he earned his law degree from the Santa Clara University School of Law and passed the California State Bar.  He is currently partner at Doty, Barlow, Britt & Thieman LLP.  He continues to play in adult soccer leagues.

References

External links
 

1972 births
Living people
All-American men's college soccer players
American soccer players
American expatriate soccer players
California lawyers
D.C. United players
Major League Soccer players
Princeton Tigers men's soccer players
Santa Clara University alumni
R. Charleroi S.C. players
D.C. United draft picks
Association football midfielders